Castets et Castillon (Gascon: Castèths e Castilhon) is a commune in the department of Gironde, southwestern France. The municipality was established on 1 January 2017 by merger of the former communes of Castets-en-Dorthe (the seat) and Castillon-de-Castets.

See also 
Communes of the Gironde department

References 

Communes of Gironde